Marie Gignac  is a two-time Genie Award–nominated actress. Gignac has been nominated twice in the category of Best Supporting Actress each for The Confessional (Le Confessionnal) and ''The Secret Life of Happy People (La Vie secrète des gens heureux).

In 2011, she was made a Member of the Order of Canada "for her contributions to the performing arts as an actress, director, playwright and artistic director of Québec’s Carrefour international de théâtre."

References

External links
 

20th-century Canadian actresses
21st-century Canadian actresses
Canadian film actresses
Canadian television actresses
Actresses from Quebec
French Quebecers
Living people
Members of the Order of Canada
Year of birth missing (living people)